Hrid Majharey (হৃদ্‌ মাঝারে)  is a 2014 India-Bengali cult love tragedy film written and directed by debutant Bengali filmmaker Ranjan Ghosh. It was first presented as a tribute on Shakespeare's 450th Birth Anniversary in 2014.

The movie was showcased at a British Conference on the Bard held in London  in April 2016 to mark 400 years of his death.

In 2015, the movie was screened at the New York University Tisch School of the Arts.

Matinee idols Abir Chatterjee and Raima Sen debuted together in a romantic pairing for the very first time in this modern revisiting of William Shakespeare.

Theme 
Math professor Abhijit and trainee Cardiologist Debjani's love story begins one rainy evening on a lonely Calcutta street. And it ends on yet another rainy evening in Port Blair, in the Andaman Islands. In between, lies a roller coaster journey dotted by love and jealousy, faith and delusion, destiny and free will.

The central theme is 'Character is Destiny'. What happens to us in our lives is determined by who we are. It talks about 'Self-fulfilling Prophecy' wherein a prophecy is made to a person and he, in the process of doing everything to prevent it from happening, actually goes about fulfilling it. The film is also about the unattainability of our most cherished dreams. All that we dream of in our lives, most often remain out of our reach.

Plot 
The film begins with a shot in which a very dishevelled looking Abhijit (Abir Chatterjee) enters the room to find Debjani (Raima Sen) lying dead on the bed. The story goes back to a flashback and we get to see the reason behind such a fatal outcome. Abhijit is a professor of mathematics at St. Xavier's College, Kolkata. He lives with his only sister Mallika who is a crime journalist by profession. 

He has a chance meeting with a soothsayer (Sohag Sen) who warns Abhijit to stay away from love for his own good, but the warning is ignored by the professor. One rainy night he comes across a beautiful damsel in distress, Debjani. She is stranded, as her taxi has broken down. He gives Debjani, a trainee heart surgeon, a lift in his car and Cupid strikes. They date and fall in love. Abhijit, however, faces a problem at his job when an infatuated student proposes him. He rejects her, and in retaliation she does something to get back at the professor. He is initially arrested, and then ostracized by one and all. Faced with such grave issues at work, he goes to the Andamans along with Debjani in search of a new life. 

There they meet Subhro (Indrasish Roy) who is Debjani's junior from their high school days. Subhro runs an NGO at Port Blair and composes music in his pastime. Subhro and Debjani spend time together rejuvenating their old friendship. At times, Abhijit gets jealous of Subhro's unwavering attention on Debjani. Subhro dies in an accident and this leaves Abhijit in a confused state. He begins to question himself about the prophecy of the soothsayer. What actually happens next? Does Abhijit leave Debjani? And how does she die?

Cast 
 Abir Chatterjee as Abhijit Mukherjee
 Raima Sen as Debjani
 Indrasish Roy as Subhro Sarkar
 Barun Chanda as Professor Sen
 Sohag Sen as Ho Chin Hua
 Arun Mukherjee as Pagla Dashu
 Tamal Roychowdhury as Professor Basu
 Madhuchhanda Ghosh as 'Reba Maashi'
 Tanusree Goswami as Mallika Mukherjee
 Prasun Chatterjee as Indra Halder
 Aditya Sengupta as Amit Mishra
 Sonali Sanyal as Shinjini Mitra
 Breeti Sarkar as Niomi Dey

Scripting and pre-production 

The first draft of the screenplay was written in 2008 and underwent numerous rewrites until it got a producer in 2012. This was an assignment in the Scriptwriting syllabus at Whistling Woods International Film Institute where Ghosh was a Screenwriting student from 2007 to 2009.

Pre-production spanned over four months from October 2012 until January 2013. Reece was carried out extensively in Kolkata and twice in the Andaman Islands to scout for apt yet budget-friendly locations. Jet Airways partnered as the travel sponsor for the Andaman Islands Reece and shoot.

Principal photography and post-production 

The film was shot on the RED EPIC Camera by ace cinematographer Sirsha Ray who had shot Bollywood movies Home Delivery and Aladin and Bengali films Clerk, Shabdo, Shesher Kabita and Apur Panchali, among others. The first day of the shoot was on 3 February 2013. The film was shot over a period of 23 days with 13 days shoot in Kolkata and the remaining 10 days in the Andaman & Nicobar Islands.

Being the only other Bengali film (after Sabuj Dwiper Raja-1979) to be shot in the Archipelagos, Hrid Majharey also became the first ever Bengali film and one of the rare Indian films to have been shot inside the hallowed cells of the Cellular Jail in Port Blair. The crew also filmed at Ross Island, Havelock Islands, Chidia Tapu, Corbyn's Cove Beach, Munda Pahar Beach, Wandoor Beach, Aberdeen Bazaar, the Marine Jetty, and at a host of other private and Government owned locations.

The film was edited by Bodhaditya Banerjee and the music production was done by National Film Awards winning music director Mayookh Bhaumik.

Legacy 

In 2015, the Oxford, Cambridge and RSA Examinations Board enlisted Hrid Majharey in 'Additional References - World/International Adaptations of Othello' for their 'A Level Drama and Theatre' course with the theme 'Heroes and Villains - Othello'. Prominent international movies in the exclusive list of nine were A Double Life (USA, 1947), All Night Long (UK, 1962), Catch My Soul (USA, 1974), O (USA, 2001), Omkara (India, 2006), among others.

Shakespearean experts consider Hrid Majharey as a major film from India that has deftly handled the Shakespearean themes, and have included the movie in their list of Top 10 film adaptations of Shakespeare's works, since 1949. In their own words, "Over the years, Indian cinema has taken his unforgettable characters and resurrected them, making sure that the Shakespearean dynasty multiplies by the dozen. The ten faces we’ve chosen are pukka Shakespeare-wallahs. They have the Bard’s blood flowing through their veins. Together, they just prove one thing – when anything from Stratford gets stratified in India, the result is always A-one." The list includes classics like Ganasundari Katha (1949), Angoor (1982), Kannaki (2001), and Maqbool (2003), among others.

The film was the focus in the 'Bengali Shakespeares' Chapter at an international conference titled 'Indian Shakespeares on Screen' jointly held by the British Film Institute and The University of London in April 2016 in London to mark 400 years of the Bard's demise.

Vidura magazine, published by Press Institute of India, featured Hrid Majharey in their October–December 2016 edition, three years after its theatrical release.

Soundtrack 

The soundtrack has music composed by Mayookh Bhaumik, with lyrics by Kaushik Ganguly and Prasenjit Mukherjee. The music was released on 1 July 2014.

References

External links 
 

Indian romantic drama films
Bengali-language Indian films
2010s Bengali-language films
2014 romantic drama films
Films set in Kolkata
Films about educators
Films set in the Andaman and Nicobar Islands